This is a list of the largest European stadiums. Stadiums with a capacity of 25,000 or more are included. The list includes stadiums in European countries.

They are ordered by their audience capacity. The capacity figures are for each stadium's permanent total capacity, including seating and any official standing areas. The capacity does include movable seating – used by multi-purpose stadiums to regularly convert the stadium for different sports, and retractable seating for safe standing, but excludes any temporary seating or standing, such as for concerts. Stadiums are sorted in the list based on the largest of these capacities.

Current stadiums: capacity of 25,000 or more
Notes:

(d) indicates retractable seating deployed,
(nd) indicates retractable seating not deployed,
(m) indicates movable seating deployed,
(t) indicates capacity with temporary seats to be removed

An asterisk – * – indicates that a team does not play all of its home matches at that venue.

The "Category" column indicates whether the stadium has been designated by UEFA as capable of hosting club competitions such as the UEFA Champions League, UEFA Europa League and UEFA Europa Conference League, and national team competitions such as the UEFA European Championship and the Nations League, as well as hosting the FIFA World Cup in Europe. Category 4 stadiums must not have a capacity less than 60,000 for the UEFA Champions League and UEFA Euro finals, 30,000 for the UEFA Europa League and Nations League finals, and 8,000 for the UEFA Europa Conference League final.

Capacity above 80,000

Capacity of 70,000–80,000

Capacity of 60,000–70,000

Capacity of 50,000–60,000

Capacity of 40,000–50,000

Capacity of 30,000–40,000

Capacity of 25,000–30,000

Under construction

The following is a list of European stadiums which are currently under construction and will have a capacity of 25,000 or more.

Albania below 25,000 capacity

Austria below 25,000 capacity

Austria below 25,000 capacity indoor stadiums

Belarus below 25,000 capacity

Belgium below 25,000 capacity

Belgium below 25,000 capacity indoor stadiums

Bosnia and Herzegovina below 25,000 capacity

Bosnia and Herzegovina below 25,000 capacity indoor stadiums

Bulgaria below 25,000 capacity

Bulgaria below 25,000 capacity indoor stadiums

Croatia below 25,000 capacity

Croatia below 25,000 capacity indoor stadiums

Czech Republic below 25,000 capacity

Czech Republic below 25,000 capacity indoor stadiums

Denmark below 25,000 capacity

Denmark below 25,000 capacity indoor stadiums

Estonia below 25,000 capacity

Finland below 25,000 capacity

Finland below 25,000 capacity indoor stadiums

France below 25,000 capacity

France below 25,000 capacity indoor stadiums

Germany below 25,000 capacity

Germany below 25,000 capacity indoor stadiums

Greece below 25,000 capacity

Greece below 25,000 capacity indoor stadiums

Hungary below 25,000 capacity

Ireland below 25,000 capacity

Ireland below 25,000 capacity indoor stadiums

Italy below 25,000 capacity

Italy below 25,000 capacity indoor stadiums

Kosovo below 25,000 capacity

Latvia below 25,000 capacity indoor stadiums

Lithuania below 25,000 capacity

Lithuania below 25,000 capacity indoor stadiums

Malta below 25,000 capacity

Moldova below 25,000 capacity

Monaco below 25,000 capacity

Montenegro below 25,000 capacity

Netherlands below 25,000 capacity

Netherlands below 25,000 capacity indoor stadiums

Norway below 25,000 capacity

Poland below 25,000 capacity

Poland below 25,000 capacity indoor stadiums

Portugal below 25,000 capacity

Portugal below 25,000 capacity indoor stadiums

Romania below 25,000 capacity

Romania below 25,000 capacity indoor stadiums

Russia below 25,000 capacity

Russia below 25,000 capacity indoor stadiums

Serbia below 25,000 capacity

Serbia below 25,000 capacity indoor stadiums

Slovakia below 25,000 capacity

Slovakia below 25,000 capacity indoor stadiums

Slovenia below 25,000 capacity

Spain below 25,000 capacity

Spain below 25,000 capacity indoor stadiums

Sweden below 25,000 capacity

Sweden below 25,000 capacity indoor stadiums

Switzerland below 25,000 capacity

Switzerland below 25,000 capacity indoor stadiums

Ukraine below 25,000 capacity

United Kingdom below 25,000 capacity

United Kingdom below 25,000 indoor stadiums

See also

Lists of stadiums by continent by capacity
 List of African stadiums by capacity
 List of Asian stadiums by capacity
 List of North American stadiums by capacity
 List of Oceanian stadiums by capacity
 List of South American stadiums by capacity

Lists of sport venues worldwide

 List of association football stadiums by capacity
 List of association football stadiums by country
 List of athletics stadiums
 List of baseball stadiums by capacity
 List of basketball arenas
 List of bullrings by capacity
 List of closed stadiums by capacity
 List of covered stadiums by capacity
 List of cricket grounds by capacity
 List of future stadiums
 List of indoor arenas
 List of indoor arenas by capacity
 List of rugby league stadiums by capacity
 List of rugby union stadiums by capacity
 List of sporting venues with a highest attendance of 100,000 or more
 List of sports venues by capacity
 List of stadiums by capacity
 List of tennis stadiums by capacity

Lists of stadiums by European country
 List of stadiums in Albania
 List of football stadiums in Austria
 List of indoor arenas in Austria
 List of football stadiums in Belarus
 List of football stadiums in Belgium
 List of indoor arenas in Belgium
 List of football stadiums in Bosnia and Herzegovina
 List of football stadiums in Bulgaria
 List of football stadiums in Croatia
 List of football stadiums in the Czech Republic
 List of indoor arenas in the Czech Republic
 List of football stadiums in Denmark
 List of indoor arenas in Denmark
 List of football stadiums in England
 List of stadiums in England
 List of football stadiums in Estonia
 List of football stadiums in Finland
 List of indoor arenas in Finland
 List of football stadiums in France
 List of indoor arenas in France
 List of rugby union stadiums in France
 List of football stadiums in Germany
 List of indoor arenas in Germany
 List of football stadiums in Greece
 List of indoor arenas in Greece
 List of football stadiums in Hungary
 List of stadiums in Ireland by capacity
 List of football stadiums in Italy
 List of indoor arenas in Italy
 List of football stadiums in Kosovo
 List of football stadiums in Latvia
 List of football stadiums in Lithuania
 List of indoor arenas in Lithuania
 List of football stadiums in Malta
 List of football stadiums in Moldova
 List of football stadiums in Monaco
 List of football stadiums in Montenegro
 List of football stadiums in the Netherlands
 List of indoor arenas in the Netherlands
 List of association football stadiums in Northern Ireland
 List of football stadiums in Norway
 List of indoor arenas in Norway
 List of football stadiums in Poland
 List of indoor arenas in Poland
 List of football stadiums in Portugal
 List of indoor arenas in Portugal
 List of football stadiums in Romania
 List of football stadiums in Russia
 List of indoor arenas in Russia
 List of football stadiums in Scotland
 List of football stadiums in Serbia
 List of indoor arenas in Serbia
 List of football stadiums in Slovakia
 List of football stadiums in Slovenia
 List of stadiums in Spain
 List of football stadiums in Sweden
 List of indoor arenas in Sweden
 List of football stadiums in Switzerland
 List of indoor arenas in Switzerland
 List of football stadiums in Ukraine
 List of indoor arenas in the United Kingdom
 List of stadiums in the United Kingdom by capacity
 List of stadiums in Wales by capacity

Other
 List of European ice hockey arenas
 List of indoor arenas in Europe
 List of stadiums in Europe
 UEFA stadium categories
 List of attendance figures at domestic professional sports leagues
 List of professional sports leagues by revenue

Notes

References

Association football in Europe
European stadiums by capacity
European stadiums by capacity
Europe sport-related lists
Lists of buildings and structures in Europe